Chingola District is a district of Zambia, located in Copperbelt Province. The capital lies at Chingola. As of the 2010 Zambian Census, the district had a population of 216,626 people. It is divided into two constituencies, namely Chingola constituency and Nchanga constituency.

References

Districts of Copperbelt Province